"Dream Weaver" is a song by the American singer Gary Wright, released as the first single from his third studio album The Dream Weaver in December 1975.

Origins and instrumentation
The track features Wright on vocals and keyboards and Jim Keltner on drums. According to Gary Wright, the song was inspired by Autobiography of a Yogi, which was given to him by George Harrison. Paramahansa Yogananda's poem "God! God! God!" made reference to "the idea of the mind weaving dreams". The expression "Dream Weaver" was popularized by John Lennon in 1970 in his song "God", taken from his solo album John Lennon/Plastic Ono Band. This song depicts Lennon's declaration that he was the dream weaver of the 1960s, breaking away from the influences and dogmas that influenced his life.

All instrumentation was created using keyboards except for Keltner's percussion. Gary Wright re-recorded "Dream Weaver" twice, first in 1986 (spelled "Dreamweaver" this time) for the Fire and Ice movie soundtrack, then a longer version for the Wayne's World movie soundtrack in 1992.

Personnel
Gary Wright - lead vocals, ARP Solina String Ensemble, Minimoogs, drum machine
David Foster - Fender Rhodes electric piano
Jim Keltner - drums

Instrumental credits taken from Mixonline.

Chart performance 
In 1976, the song became a hit in the US; it peaked at #2 on the Billboard chart.  It was kept from #1 by both "December, 1963 (Oh, What a Night)" by The Four Seasons and "Disco Lady" by Johnnie Taylor. "Dream Weaver" did get to #1 on Cashbox.

Weekly singles charts

Year-end charts

Certifications

In popular culture 
The song has been heard in many films and television programs. According to Wes Craven, the song (and its keyboard intro/outro) inspired the concept behind the 1984 film A Nightmare on Elm Street. Wright re-recorded the song for the soundtrack of the 1992 film Wayne's World. He performed the song on an episode of The Midnight Special. The song also appeared in the movie The People vs. Larry Flynt.

See also 

 1975 in music

References

External links 
Stadia – Official Launch Trailer
 

1975 singles
Gary Wright songs
Warner Records singles
Songs written by Gary Wright
Cashbox number-one singles
RPM Top Singles number-one singles
Indian mythology in music
Progressive pop songs
Songs about dreams
Songs about outer space
Paramahansa Yogananda